Rusalka ("mermaid"; also Russalka and Roussalka) is a seaside resort on the northern Bulgarian Black Sea Coast located in Dobrich Province, northeastern Bulgaria (the historical region of Southern Dobruja). It is located in a nature reserve in a bay 90 km northeast of Varna and 23 km from Shabla, surrounded by oak forests.

The whole resort is an all-inclusive area of 600 luxurious one-storey houses. It is a favoured place for foreign tourists, in the 2000s mainly from Germany, although in the 1990s it was a French-dominated area.

Rusalka offers 10 hard tennis courts and 5 clay ones, making it an appropriate destination for tennis fans, as well as a small football pitch and a volleyball court. Other sports that can be practised are  archery, horse riding, yachting, kayaking, scuba diving, etc. The resort also has an open-air mineral-water swimming pool with water jets. Many islets and rocks lie just off the beach.

Attractions in the vicinity include the Yaylata and Kaliakra nature and history reserves.

Seaside resorts in Bulgaria
Buildings and structures in Dobrich Province
Tourist attractions in Dobrich Province